The Chief Minister of Maharashtra is the head of the executive branch of the government of the Indian state of Maharashtra. Following elections to the Legislative Assembly, the governor invites the party (or coalition) with a majority of seats to form the government and appoints the chief minister. If the appointee is not a member of either the Legislative Assembly or the Legislative Council of Maharashtra, then the Constitution stipulates that they need to be elected within six months of being sworn in. The office of the CM is coterminous with the concurrent Assembly provided the CM commands confidence in the house and hence does not exceed five years. However, it is subject to no term limits.

Maharashtra was formed by dissolution of Bombay State on 1 May 1960. Yashwantrao Chavan, who was serving as the third CM of Bombay State since 1956, became the first CM of Maharashtra. He belonged to the Indian National Congress and held the office until the 1962 Assembly elections. Marotrao Kannamwar succeeded him and was the only CM to die while in office. Vasantrao Naik, who was in office from December 1963 to February 1975 for more than 11 years, has by far been the longest serving CM. He also was the first and only CM to complete his full term of five years (1967-1972) till Devendra Fadnavis matched it (2014-2019). With the exceptions of Manohar Joshi (SS), Narayan Rane (SS), Devendra Fadnavis (BJP), Uddhav Thackeray (SS) and Eknath Shinde (SS), all other CMs have been from the Congress or its breakaway parties.

So far, President's rule has been imposed thrice in the state: first from February to June 1980 and again from September to October 2014. It was again imposed on 12 November 2019.

The current incumbent is Eknath Shinde of the Shiv Sena since 30 June 2022.

Precursors

Key 
Colour key for political parties

Prime Ministers of Bombay (1937-47)

Chief Ministers of Bombay State (1947-60)

Chief Ministers of Maharashtra

Key
 No.: Incumbent number
  Assassinated or died in office
  Returned to office after a previous non-consecutive term
  Resigned
  Resigned following a no-confidence motion

Legend

Timeline

See also
List of governors of Maharashtra
List of deputy chief ministers of Maharashtra
List of chairmen of the Maharashtra Legislative Council
List of speakers of the Maharashtra Legislative Assembly
List of Deputy Speakers of the Maharashtra Legislative Assembly
List of Leader of the House of the Maharashtra Legislative Assembly
List of Leaders of the House of the Maharashtra Legislative Council
List of Leader of the Opposition of the Maharashtra Legislative Assembly
List of Leader of the Opposition of the Maharashtra Legislative Council

Notes

References

Government of Maharashtra
Maharashtra
 
Chief Ministers